Bundi is a rural locality in the Western Downs Region, Queensland, Australia.

Geography 
There are many coal seam gas bores in the southern part of the locality.

History 

References 

Western Downs Region
Localities in Queensland